Sexy as Hell is the seventh studio album by German singer Sarah Connor. It was released by X-Cell Records on 22 August 2008 in German-speaking Europe. Connor's first regular release of original material since her 2005 studio album Naughty but Nice, she consulted Danish producers Remee and Thomas Troelsen to work with her on Sexy as Hell. Aside from the duo, Connor also worked with duo Marek Pompetzki and Paul NZA and reteamed with as frequent contributors Rob Tyger and Kay Denar as well as Bülent Aris. Sexy as Hell has been called an "inspiration" by English singer Jack Lucien for his second studio album EuroSceptic.

Track listing

Charts

Weekly charts

Year-end charts

Release history

References

2008 albums
Sarah Connor (singer) albums
Albums produced by J. R. Rotem
Albums produced by Thomas Troelsen